Manchester is a city in Northwest England. The M1 postcode area of the city includes part of the city centre, in particular the Northern Quarter, the area known as Chinatown, and part of the district of Chorlton-on-Medlock. The postcode area contains 193 listed buildings that are recorded in the National Heritage List for England. Of these, 14 are listed at Grade II*, the middle of the three grades, and the others are at Grade II, the lowest grade.

The area was an important commercial centre, and this is reflected in the listed buildings, as more than half of them originated as warehouses built mainly in the second half of the 19th century and the first quarter of the 20th century. These buildings also reflect the commercial wealth in the city at this time as many are elaborately decorated and designed in a variety of architectural styles, including Classical, Baroque, Romanesque, Gothic, and Edwardian Baroque. Some are in the form of an Italian palazzo, and one is in the form of a Scottish Baronial castle. Most of the warehouses have since been converted for other purposes, including offices, shops, hotels, and apartments. Industry in the city was stimulated by the arrival of canals in the late 18th century and railways in the early 19th century. The Ashton Canal and the Rochdale Canal pass through the area and form a junction within it. Listed structures associated with the canals include a flight of locks, an aqueduct, boundary walls, and bridges. Listed buildings associated with the railways include two stations, a viaduct, a warehouse, and goods offices. The area contained textile mills, some of which have survived and are listed, most of them in Chorlton-on-Medlock. On the edge of the commercial area is Piccadilly Gardens, an open space that contains a number of listed statues. Other listed buildings include houses, hotels and public houses, factories, civic buildings, offices, educational buildings, a former power station, and places of entertainment including former cinemas and a dance hall.


Key

Buildings

Notes and references

Notes

Citations

Sources

Lists of listed buildings in Greater Manchester
Buildings and structures in Manchester